Sorbinipercidae is an extinct family of zeiid fish from the Eocene of Monte Bolca.

References

 Fishes of the World by Joseph S. Nelson (page 340)
 Exceptional Fossil Preservation by David J. Bottjer, Walter Etter, James W. Hagadorn, and Carol M. Tang (page 377)

Eocene fish
Zeiformes
Fossils of Italy
Prehistoric ray-finned fish families